Ihab Habib Hassan (October 17, 1925 – September 10, 2015) was an Egypt-born American literary theorist and writer.

Biography
Ihab Hassan was born in Cairo, Egypt, and emigrated to the United States in 1946. He was Emeritus Vilas Research Professor at the University of Wisconsin–Milwaukee. His writings include Radical Innocence: Studies in the Contemporary American Novel (1961), The Literature of Silence: Henry Miller and Samuel Beckett (1967), The Dismemberment of Orpheus: Toward a Postmodern Literature (1971, 1982), Paracriticisms: Seven Speculations of the Times (1975), The Right Promethean Fire: Imagination, Science, and Cultural Change (1980), The Postmodern Turn: Essays in Postmodern Theory and Culture (1987), Selves at Risk: Patterns of Quest in Contemporary American Letters (1990), and Rumors of Change: Essays of Five Decades (1995), as well as two memoirs, Out of Egypt: Scenes and Arguments of an Autobiography (1985) and Between the Eagle and the Sun: Traces of Japan (1996). More recently, he published many short stories in various literary magazines and is completing a novel, The Changeling. His last published work was In Quest of Nothing: Selected Essays, 1998-2008 (2010). In addition, he has written more than 300 essays and reviews on literary and cultural subjects.

Hassan received honorary degrees from the Faculty of Humanities at Uppsala University, Sweden (1996) and the University of Giessen (1999), two Guggenheim Fellowships (1958, 1962), and three Senior Fulbright Lectureships (1966, 1974, 1975). He was on the Faculty of the School of Letters, Indiana University (1964), Visiting Fellow at the Woodrow Wilson International Center for Scholars (1972), twice on the Faculty of the Salzburg Summer Seminars in American Studies (1965,1975), Senior Fellow at the Camargo Foundation in Cassis (1974–1975), Resident Scholar at the Rockefeller Study Center in Bellagio (1978), twice a Senior Fellow at the Humanities Research Center in Canberra (1990, 2003), Resident Fellow at the Humanities Research Institute of the University of California, Irvine (1990), on the Faculty of the Stuttgart Summer Seminars in Cultural Studies (1991), and three times on the Faculty of the Scandinavian Summer School of Literary Theory and Criticism in Karlskrona (2000, 2001, 2004).  He has also received the Alumni Teaching Award and the Honors Program Teaching Award at the University of Wisconsin in Milwaukee, where he has taught for 29 years. In addition he has delivered more than 500 public lectures in North America, Europe, Asia, Africa, Australia, and New Zealand.

The following table is taken from a part of The Dismemberment of Orpheus that was reprinted in Postmodern American Fiction: A Norton Anthology (1998). It seeks to explain the differences, both concrete and abstract, between modernism and postmodernism.

Hassan's table of differences between modernism and postmodernism 

Hassan's Table of Differences between Modernism and Postmodernism ends with the statement (The Dismemberment of Orpheus, p. 269): "Yet the dichotomies this table represents remain insecure, equivocal. For differences shift, defer, even collapse; concepts in any one vertical column are not all equivalent; and inversions and exceptions, in both modernism and postmodernism, abound."

References

External links

Archival collections
Guide to the Ihab Hassan Papers. Special Collections and Archives, The UC Irvine Libraries, Irvine, California.

Other
 Official Website
 "Toward a Concept of Postmodernism" (1987)

1925 births
2015 deaths
Egyptian literary critics
Egyptian philosophers
Postmodernism
Postmodern theory
Posthumanists
University of Wisconsin–Milwaukee faculty
American literary critics
Egyptian emigrants to the United States